Joakim Wulff (born 6 February 1979) is a Swedish footballer who plays as a goalkeeper for IFK Värnamo in Superettan.

References

External links
 
 

1979 births
Living people
Swedish footballers
Association football goalkeepers
Östers IF players
IF Elfsborg players
Falkenbergs FF players
Varbergs BoIS players
IK Sirius Fotboll players
IFK Värnamo players
Allsvenskan players
Superettan players